The Hunt effect or Luminance-on-colorfulness effect comprises an increase in colorfulness of a color with increasing luminance. The effect was first described by RWG Hunt in 1952.

Hunt noted that this effect occurs at low luminance levels. At higher luminance, he noted a hue shift of colors to be more blue with higher luminance, which is now known as the Bezold–Brücke effect. The hunt effect is related to the Helmholtz–Kohlrausch effect, where a partially desaturated stimulus is seen to be brighter than fully saturated or achromatic stimuli.

See also 

 Opponent process
 Purkinje shift
 Abney effect

References

Color appearance phenomena